Martin "Rook" O'Prey was an Irish republican and a Volunteer in both Irish republican and Revolutionary socialist paramilitary groups, first the Irish National Liberation Army (INLA) and later the Irish People's Liberation Organisation (IPLO). He was killed by Ulster Loyalist paramilitaries from the Ulster Volunteer Force (UVF) in August 1991.

INLA & IPLO Paramilitary actions
In September 1981, when he was a part of the Irish National Liberation Army Belfast Brigade, O'Prey and the INLA Belfast Brigade O/C Gerard Steenson killed a British UDR soldier Mark Stockman in a west Belfast factory on the Springfield Road.
As O/C of the IPLO's Belfast Brigade O'Prey is believed to have been part of the hit team that killed outspoken Loyalist and UVF member George Seawright in November 1987. He was also alleged to have been involved in the killing of Ulster Freedom Fighters (UFF) member William Quee, when he was shot and killed by the IPLO at his shop in Oldpark Road, Belfast.
Probably the most infamous act he was involved in, was the Orange Cross Social Club shooting, in which a member of the Loyalist paramilitary the Red Hand Commando was killed and several others were injured. O'Prey led the attack on the Orange Cross himself. After these actions he became a prime target for Loyalists, as one UVF man put it:
"When the Catholic kids rioted with kids from the Shankill along the peace line they used to shout at the Prods 'We'll get Rook for ya'. O'Prey was an enemy celebrity on the Shankill."

Death
On 16 August 1991 an Ulster Volunteer Force (UVF) team burst into his home in Ardmoulin Terrace on the Lower Falls in west Belfast. Two UVF men broke into the back of O'Prey's home and found him on the sofa in his living room along with his daughter and a friend. The UVF men fired shots at O'Prey killing him while he lay on the sofa, his daughter and the other man were unharmed.
Jimmy Brown, founder and leader of the IPLO along with its political wing Republican Socialist Collective and a close friend of O'Prey, gave the graveside oration at O'Prey's funeral.

O'Prey is buried in the Republican & IPLO plot in Milltown Cemetery.

On the 20th anniversary of his death a commemorative plaque was unveiled outside his home.

See also
 Jimmy Brown (Irish republican)
 Christopher "Crip" McWilliams
 Sammy Ward
 Gerard Steenson

References

1960s births
1991 deaths
Deaths by firearm in Northern Ireland
Irish National Liberation Army members
Irish People's Liberation Organisation
Irish republicans
People killed by the Ulster Volunteer Force
Republicans imprisoned during the Northern Ireland conflict